Nicholas Butcher (born May 7, 1976 in Los Angeles, California) is an American former field hockey player who competed in the 1996 Summer Olympics.

References

External links
 

1976 births
Living people
American male field hockey players
Olympic field hockey players of the United States
Field hockey players at the 1996 Summer Olympics